Yukinari Tamura (born May 12, 1981) is a Japanese mixed martial artist who last competed for Shooto. A professional who began his career in 2004, he has also competed for DEEP and Pancrase.

Mixed martial arts record

|-
|Loss
|align=center| 16–14–9
|Daichi Abe
|Decision (unanimous)
|Rizin 39
|
|align=center|3
|align=center|5:00
|Fukuoka, Japan
|
|-
| Win
| align=center| 16–13–9
| Souki Toyama
| KO (punches)
| Shooto Torao 27
| 
| align=center| 2
| align=center| 3:15
| Fukuoka, Japan
| 
|-
| Loss
| align=center| 15–13–9
| Souki Toyama
| Decision (split)
| Shooto Torao 24
| 
| align=center| 3
| align=center| 5:00
| Fukuoka, Japan
| 
|-
| Win
| align=center| 15–12–9
| Will Chope
| Submission (kneebar)
| Shooto Torao 21
| 
| align=center| 2
| align=center| 4:40
| Fukuoka, Japan
| 
|-
| Win
| align=center| 14–12–9
| Bayzet Khatkhokhu
| Decision (unanimous)
| Road to Abu Dhabi Warriors: Thailand
| 
| align=center| 3
| align=center| 5:00
| Bangkok, Thailand
| 
|-
| Loss
| align=center| 13–12–9
| Kimihiro Eto
| Decision (majority)
| DEEP: 76 Impact
| 
| align=center| 2
| align=center| 5:00
| Tokyo, Japan
| 
|-
| Draw
| align=center| 13–11–9
| Luiz Andrade I
| Draw (majority)
| DEEP Cage Impact 2015
| 
| align=center| 2
| align=center| 5:00
| Tokyo, Japan
| 
|-
| Loss
| align=center| 13–11–8
| Shigetoshi Iwase
| TKO (punches)
| DEEP: 70 Impact
| 
| align=center| 2
| align=center| 3:40
| Tokyo, Japan
| 
|-
| Draw
| align=center| 13–10–8
| Yoichi Fukumoto
| Draw (unanimous)
| DEEP: 68 Impact
| 
| align=center| 2
| align=center| 5:00
| Tokyo, Japan
| 
|-
| Loss
| align=center| 13–10–7
| Alexander Sarnavskiy
| Submission (rear-naked choke)
| Ural Fight League: Resurrection
| 
| align=center| 3
| align=center| 4:54
| Ekaterinburg, Russia
| 
|-
| Win
| align=center| 13–9–7
| Shinichiro Tanaka
| Submission (triangle choke)
| DEEP: Osaka Impact 2014
| 
| align=center| 1
| align=center| 0:39
| Osaka, Japan
| 
|-
| Draw
| align=center| 12–9–7
| Juri Ohara
| Draw (majority)
| DEEP: Cage Impact 2013
| 
| align=center| 2
| align=center| 5:00
| Tokyo, Japan
| 
|-
| Win
| align=center| 12–9–6
| Ryuichiro Sumimura
| Decision (majority)
| DEEP: Osaka Impact 2013
| 
| align=center| 3
| align=center| 5:00
| Osaka, Japan
| 
|-
| Win
| align=center| 11–9–6
| Kenta Takagi
| Decision (unanimous)
| Shooto: 10th Round
| 
| align=center| 3
| align=center| 5:00
| Tokyo, Japan
| 
|-
| Win
| align=center| 10–9–6
| Tomokazu Yuasa
| Decision (unanimous)
| Shooto: Gig West 14
| 
| align=center| 2
| align=center| 5:00
| Osaka, Kansai, Japan
| 
|-
| Loss
| align=center| 9–9–6
| Yusuke Hoshiko
| Decision (unanimous)
| Rising On: Kyushu
| 
| align=center| 3
| align=center| 5:00
| Kumamoto, Japan
| 
|-
| Loss
| align=center| 9–8–6
| Keiichiro Yamamiya
| Decision (majority)
| Pancrase: Progress Tour 1
| 
| align=center| 2
| align=center| 5:00
| Tokyo, Japan
| 
|-
| Draw
| align=center| 9–7–6
| Masahiro Toryu
| Draw (majority)
| Pancrase: Impressive Tour 12
| 
| align=center| 2
| align=center| 5:00
| Osaka, Osaka, Japan
| 
|-
| Loss
| align=center| 9–7–5
| A-Sol Kwon
| KO (knee)
| Heat: Heat 18
| 
| align=center| 1
| align=center| 0:31
| Osaka, Japan
| 
|-
| Loss
| align=center| 9–6–5
| Isao Kobayashi
| Decision (split)
| Pancrase: Impressive Tour 4
| 
| align=center| 2
| align=center| 3:00
| Tokyo, Japan
| 
|-
| Loss
| align=center| 9–5–5
| Kotetsu Boku
| Decision (unanimous)
| Shooto: Shootor's Legacy 1
| 
| align=center| 3
| align=center| 5:00
| Tokyo, Japan
| 
|-
| Win
| align=center| 9–4–5
| Tony Hervey
| Submission (rear-naked choke)
| KOTC: Sniper
| 
| align=center| 1
| align=center| 2:25
| San Bernardino, California, United States
| 
|-
| Loss
| align=center| 8–4–5
| Daisuke Sugie
| Submission (armbar)
| Shooto: Border: Season 2: Vibration
| 
| align=center| 2
| align=center| 4:09
| Osaka, Kansai, Japan
| 
|-
| Win
| align=center| 8–3–5
| Hiroshi Shiba
| Decision (unanimous)
| Shooto: Alternative 1
| 
| align=center| 2
| align=center| 5:00
| Osaka, Kansai, Japan
| 
|-
| Win
| align=center| 7–3–5
| Shinji Sasaki
| Decision (unanimous)
| Shooto: Revolutionary Exchanges 1: Undefeated
| 
| align=center| 2
| align=center| 5:00
| Tokyo, Japan
| 
|-
| Draw
| align=center| 6–3–5
| Guy Delumeau
| Draw
| Shooto: Shooting Disco 9: Superman
| 
| align=center| 2
| align=center| 5:00
| Tokyo, Japan
| 
|-
| Loss
| align=center| 6–3–4
| Kazuya Satomoto
| TKO (doctor stoppage)
| Shooto: Border: Season 1: Outbreak
| 
| align=center| 2
| align=center| 1:10
| Osaka, Kansai, Japan
| 
|-
| Loss
| align=center| 6–2–4
| Ikuo Usuda
| Decision (unanimous)
| Shooto: The Rookie Tournament 2008 Final
| 
| align=center| 2
| align=center| 5:00
| Tokyo, Japan
| 
|-
| Draw
| align=center| 6–1–4
| Hiroshi Sugimoto
| Draw
| Shooto: Gig West 10
| 
| align=center| 2
| align=center| 5:00
| Osaka, Kansai, Japan
| 
|-
| Win
| align=center| 6–1–3
| Kunio Nakajima
| Decision (unanimous)
| Shooto: Gig Central 15
| 
| align=center| 2
| align=center| 5:00
| Nagoya, Aichi, Japan
| 
|-
| Win
| align=center| 5–1–3
| Taro Kusano
| Decision (majority)
| Shooto: Gig West 9
| 
| align=center| 2
| align=center| 5:00
| Osaka, Kansai, Japan
| 
|-
| Win
| align=center| 4–1–3
| Naoki Matsushita
| TKO (doctor stoppage)
| DEEP: Protect Impact 2007
| 
| align=center| 2
| align=center| 3:46
| Osaka, Japan
| 
|-
| Win
| align=center| 3–1–3
| William Animal
| Submission (punches)
| DEEP: 30 Impact
| 
| align=center| 1
| align=center| 4:36
| Osaka, Japan
| 
|-
| Loss
| align=center| 2–1–3
| Milton Vieira
| Submission (rear-naked choke)
| Real Rhythm: 5th Stage
| 
| align=center| 2
| align=center| 2:34
| Osaka, Japan
| 
|-
| Win
| align=center| 2–0–3
| Noritaka Sasamoto
| Submission (armbar)
| Real Rhythm: 4th Stage
| 
| align=center| 1
| align=center| 4:39
| Osaka, Japan
| 
|-
| Draw
| align=center| 1–0–3
| Kenichi Hattori
| Draw (unanimous)
| DEEP: clubDEEP Nagoya: MB3z Impact, Di Entrare
| 
| align=center| 2
| align=center| 5:00
| Nagoya, Japan
| 
|-
| Win
| align=center| 1–0–2
| Katsunori Kikuno
| Decision (unanimous)
| DEEP: 23 Impact
| 
| align=center| 2
| align=center| 5:00
| Tokyo, Japan
| 
|-
| Draw
| align=center| 0–0–2
| Maurcio Ishizuka
| Draw (time limit)
| DEEP: clubDEEP Osaka
| 
| align=center| 2
| align=center| 5:00
| Osaka, Japan
| 
|-
| Draw
| align=center| 0–0–1
| Tomoyoshi Matsumoto
| Draw
| RZ: Red Zone 9
| 
| align=center| 3
| align=center| 3:00
| Osaka, Japan
|

See also
List of male mixed martial artists

References

External links
  

1981 births
Japanese male mixed martial artists
Lightweight mixed martial artists
Welterweight mixed martial artists
Living people